The Right Stuff Records is an American reissue record label that was part of EMI, which is now owned by Universal Music Group and is based out of Santa Monica, California.

The label primarily released classic rock and R&B repertoire which included greatest hits collections, anthologies, boxed sets and compilations. The Right Stuff's repertoire was sourced from the various labels owned by EMI Records and also leased-in labels such as Dick Griffey's SOLAR (the Sound of Los Angeles Records), the post-1976 Philadelphia International Records, Hi Records, Tabu Records and Salsoul Records. The label also owned Leon Russell and Denny Cordell's Shelter Records and the New  York-based Laurie Records. The label also created many joint venture projects with outside brands such as Harley-Davidson, Hot Rod Magazine, Shape Magazine, and others. The label was started by former EMI and Capitol Records executive Tom Cartwright.

Selected artists on reissues

Al Green
Alexander O'Neal
Freddie King
Natalie Cole
Maze
Leon Russell
Tavares
Rudy Ray Moore
O'Bryan
Del Shannon
The Deele
First Choice
Yma Sumac
Luther Ingram
The Whispers
George Clinton
Bobby Womack
Carrie Lucas
Loleatta Holloway
Dynasty
Portrait
Teddy Pendergrass
Lou Rawls
Phoebe Snow
The S.O.S. Band
Dion DiMucci
Shalamar
Compton's Most Wanted
Roy Harper
Ringo Starr

References

Reissue record labels
Soul music record labels
EMI